The Story of David (1976) was a two-part, 3.2 hour American television film dramatizing the biblical story of King David. It starred Timothy Bottoms as the young David, Keith Michell as the older David, Anthony Quayle as King Saul, and Jane Seymour as Bathsheba. Produced by Columbia Pictures Television for the American Broadcasting Company (ABC-TV), it premiered on 9 April 1976. It was filmed in Israel and Spain.

The Story of David was a kind of sequel to The Story of Jacob and Joseph (1974), also produced for ABC-TV (broadcast two years earlier) and involving many of the same cast and crew.

Plot summary
The narrative follows David's life from the time he was a boy shepherd to his death as the aged King of Israel.

Part 1: David and King Saul relates to the exploits of the young David (Bottoms) and his fraught relations with King Saul (Quayle). It begins with David as a humble shepherd who becomes lyre player and armourer to the King who is distraught after the prophet Samuel has chastised him for failing to follow the instructions of the Israelite god, Yahweh, in a battle. Samuel informs Saul that Yahweh will anoint another king in his place. Saul is counseled by his general and old friend Abner. Saul periodically withdraws due to an oppressive illness and, initially, David's music soothes his troubled mind. But Saul is filled with jealous rage when David becomes hero to his people after prevailing in single combat against Goliath and in a subsequent military victory over the Philistines. Although Saul has made David "Captain of a Thousand" and allowed him to marry his daughter Michal after another military exploit, in a private moment he makes an attempt on David's life with his spear, thus forcing him to flee. David is highly conflicted over his devotion to Saul as Yahweh's first anointed King over the people. He will not kill Saul, despite Saul's constant attempts on his own life, as he feels it will offend the deity. Saul's son Jonathan, the heir-apparent, secretly pledges his devotion to the fugitive David and insists on becoming blood brother to David ritualistically. Saul dies in battle and David, having previously been anointed in secret by Samuel, assumes the throne.

Part 2: David the King begins with a mature David (Michell) and tells the story of his sinning with Bathseba (Seymour), including the scenes with her bath and their subsequent love-making. As David ages he is challenged by the treason of one of his sons, and eventually passes the crown on to another of his sons, Solomon.

Cast
Part 1
Timothy Bottoms as David
Anthony Quayle as King Saul
Norman Rodway as Joab
Oded Teomi as Jonathan
Yehuda Efroni as Younger Abner
Antonio Tarruella (as Tony Tarruella) as Goliath 
Ahuva Yuval as Abigail
Irit Ben Zur (as Irit Benzer) as Michal 
Avraham Ben-Yosef as Ahimelech
Yakar Semach as Abiathar
Ilan Dar as Eliab
Dudu Topaz (as David Topaz) as Abinadab  
Ori Levy as Gaza
Part 2
Keith Michell as Older David
Jane Seymour as Bathsheba
Susan Hampshire as Michal
Yair Rubin (as Koya Reuben) as Shammab
Brian Blessed as Abner
Barry Morse as Jehosephat
David Collings as Nathan
Nelson Modling as Absolom
Terrence Hardiman as Uriah
Jeanette Sterke as Abigail
David Nielson as Amnon
Eric Chapman as Seriah
J.C. Henning as Elga
Maureen O'Connell as Maacah
Dov Reiser as Witch of Endor
Mark Dignam as Samuel/Achish (uncredited) 
Larry Kemp as Soldier (uncredited)

References

1976 films
1976 television films
ABC network original films
American television films
Films set in the 11th century BC
Television films based on the Bible
Films about David
Films shot in Almería
Films directed by Alex Segal
Films directed by David Lowell Rich
Cultural depictions of Bathsheba
Films scored by Laurence Rosenthal
1970s English-language films